Plecodus multidentatus is a species of cichlid endemic to Lake Tanganyika.  This species is a scale-eater, eating the scales off of other fishes.  This species can reach a length of  TL.

References

multidentatus
Taxa named by Max Poll
Fish described in 1952
Taxonomy articles created by Polbot